= Eliot Wagner =

American writer

Eliot Wagner is an American writer who published several novels depicting Jewish family life in New York City.

== Works ==
Wagner's first novel, Grand Concourse (1954), follows a large lower-class Jewish family in the Bronx. My America!, published in 1980, follows a Jewish family in Manhattan's Lower East Side from World War I until 1950.

=== Novels ===
- Grand Concourse (1954)
- Better Occasions (1974)
- My America! (1980)
- Princely Quest (1985)
- Nullity Decree (1991)
